In Greek mythology, Alcidamea, Alcidameia or Alcidamia (Ancient Greek: Ἀλκιδαμείας) was the Corinthian mother of Bounus by Hermes. Her son was the successor of Aeetes in the throne of Corinth before the latter migrated to Colchis.

Notes

References 

 Grimal, Pierre, The Dictionary of Classical Mythology, Wiley-Blackwell, 1996. 
 Pausanias, Description of Greece with an English Translation by W.H.S. Jones, Litt.D., and H.A. Ormerod, M.A., in 4 Volumes. Cambridge, MA, Harvard University Press; London, William Heinemann Ltd. 1918. . Online version at the Perseus Digital Library
 Pausanias, Graeciae Descriptio. 3 vols. Leipzig, Teubner. 1903.  Greek text available at the Perseus Digital Library.

Women of Hermes
Women in Greek mythology
Corinthian mythology